The Battle of Summit Point, also known as Flowing Springs or Cameron's Depot, was an inconclusive battle of the American Civil War fought on August 21, 1864, near Summit Point, West Virginia.

The battle was part of Union Maj. Gen. Philip Sheridan's Shenandoah Valley Campaign, which took place between August and December 1864. While Sheridan concentrated his army near Charles Town, Confederate Lt. Gen. Jubal A. Early and Maj. Gen. Richard H. Anderson attacked the Union forces with converging columns on August 21. Anderson struck north against the Union cavalry at Summit Point. The Union forces fought effective delaying actions, withdrawing to near Halltown on the following day. The battle resulted in approximately 1,000 casualties.

Battlefield preservation

The Civil War Trust (a division of the American Battlefield Trust) and its partners have acquired and preserved  of the battlefield.

References

External links
 Original Records Search Ohio State University.
 The Battle at Summit Point Severe Fighting Our Losses The Retrograde Movement New York Times, August 21, 1864.

Gallery

Valley campaigns of 1864
Battles of the Eastern Theater of the American Civil War
Inconclusive battles of the American Civil War
Jefferson County, West Virginia in the American Civil War
Conflicts in 1864
1864 in West Virginia
Battles of the American Civil War in West Virginia
August 1864 events